Fátima Madrid Calancha (born 28 December 1979 in Seville, Andalusia) is a coach and a former freestyle swimmer from Spain.

Career 
Madrid competed for Spain at the 1996 Summer Olympics in Atlanta, Georgia. She was eliminated in the qualifying heats of the 4 × 100 m Freestyle Relay with her teammates Blanca Cerón, Susanna Garabatos and Claudia Franco. A year later, the Spanish relay team including Cerón, Madrid, Ana Belén Palomo and Franco finished first at the Mediterranean Games.

She was a member of the swimming club Club Natación Los Palacios in Seville. In 2000, she started a new career as a personal coach and, in 2010, she published a book on health and prevention.

Bibliography 
 Fátima Madrid Calancha, En salud, más prevenir que curar. Guía práctica para un bienestar físico y sobrevivir al S.XXI. Publicaciones Vértice SL, 2010, 90 p.,

Notes

References

External links 
 Spanish Olympic Committee: Atlanta games
 
 
 
 

1979 births
Living people
Spanish female freestyle swimmers
Olympic swimmers of Spain
Swimmers at the 1996 Summer Olympics
Mediterranean Games gold medalists for Spain
Mediterranean Games medalists in swimming
Swimmers at the 1997 Mediterranean Games